Amburana is a genus of legume in the family Fabaceae. It contains three species:
 Amburana acreana (Ducke) A. C. Sm.
 Amburana cearensis (Allemão) A. C. Sm.—Umburana do Cheiro

 Amburana erythrosperma Seleme et al.

References

Amburaneae
Fabaceae genera
Neotropical realm flora
Taxonomy articles created by Polbot